Essentials is the Sony PlayStation budget range in the PAL region, which covers Europe, the Middle East and Africa as well as Australia and South Asia. It was launched in January 1997 as the Platinum range but was later renamed for PlayStation Portable, PlayStation Vita, PlayStation 3 and PlayStation 4. Similar budget ranges from Sony include the Greatest Hits and The Best labels for the North American and Japanese markets, respectively.

Platinum Range titles were recognisable by a platinum/silver coloured band on the game's casing, both the front and the spine. The PlayStation design used the same logo that was introduced in early 1997 for all PAL region game cases, the differences being the colouring and that it indicates itself as Platinum. The PlayStation 2 design of the platinum games had a silver band to act as a border and to contain the game's original cover, which is shrunk to fill about 75% of the platinum cover. The early platinum games that were released prior to 2003 had the PlayStation logo repeated twice on the front case, once on the platinum border, and once on the original game's case. (with the original game's case dropping the PlayStation logo after 2002.) In 2005, a new featured layout was introduced; these have a black border, and silver outlines around the shrunken original game cover. There is also a red orb located at the bottom of the original game cover with the words Platinum The Best of PlayStation 2 and Platinum The Best of PSP (PlayStation Portable) for PlayStation 2 and PlayStation Portable games respectively. The platinum band can also be seen on the manual. The PlayStation 3 Platinum range box art replaces the black background of the PlayStation 3 logo on the left with a yellow background, and has the original box art shrunk slightly, with a grey border, and a yellow rectangle on top of it, with Platinum The Best of PlayStation 3 written on it.

PlayStation and PlayStation 2 platinum game discs do not feature any of the original game disc design; instead, it is replaced with a simple silver design – which, along with the copyright notices around the edges, features the game's name in the centre surrounded by a black outline. PlayStation Portable platinum games use the original UMD games' disc design whilst PlayStation 3 platinum games use the original disc design with a platinum design on the disc.

To become a Platinum release it was required that a game have over 400,000 total worldwide sales after generally one year on the market (PAL region sales in particular; games that sell over 400,000 units in another region alone, such as Japan or the U.S., do not necessarily qualify for a Platinum title).

For PlayStation 2 and PlayStation Portable releases, there is no specific target required to achieve Platinum status as indicated by SCEE Press Releases and the discrepancies between the Platinum status of specific titles and their chart performance.

After reaching the required level of sales, Sony often dropped the prices of the original title to Platinum pricing levels (generally about half of the original retail price), as a way to clear inventory for retailers.

The Platinum distinction has since been extended, however since 2010 they have been renamed Essentials for the PlayStation Portable, PlayStation 3, PlayStation Vita and PlayStation 4. The first PS3 titles were released on August 1, 2008.

For PlayStation 4 games the name was changed to PlayStation Hits. The first games under the new label were released on 18 July 2018 in PS Store and in retail stores for €19.99 each.

Platinum range

PlayStation titles

007 Racing
007: The World Is Not Enough
007: Tomorrow Never Dies
Ace Combat
Ace Combat 3: Electrosphere
Actua Soccer
Adidas Power Soccer
Air Combat
Alien Trilogy
Alone in the Dark: The New Nightmare
Ape Escape
Atlantis: The Lost Empire
A Bug's Life
Battle Arena Toshinden
Bust-A-Move 2
C-12: Final Resistance
Chase the Express
Colin McRae Rally
Colin McRae Rally 2.0
Colony Wars
Colony Wars: Red Sun
Command & Conquer
Command & Conquer: Red Alert
Command & Conquer: Red Alert: Retaliation
Cool Boarders 2
Cool Boarders 3
Cool Boarders 4
Crash Bandicoot
Crash Bandicoot 2: Cortex Strikes Back
Crash Bandicoot 3: Warped
Crash Team Racing
Crash Bash
Croc: Legend of the Gobbos
Dancing Stage EuroMix
Dancing Stage PARTY EDiTiON
Destruction Derby
Destruction Derby 2
Destruction Derby Raw
Die Hard Trilogy
Digimon World
Dino Crisis 2
Dinosaur
Disney's Aladdin in Nasira's Revenge
Disney's Action Game Featuring Hercules
Disney's Tarzan
Disney's Treasure Planet
Donald Duck: Quack Attack
Doom
Driver
Driver 2
The Emperor's New Groove

F1 Championship Season 2000
Fade to Black
FIFA Soccer 96
FIFA: Road to World Cup 98
FIFA 99
FIFA 2000
FIFA 2001
FIFA Football 2005
Final Fantasy VII
Final Fantasy VIII
Final Fantasy IX
Formula 1
Formula 1 97
Formula One 2001
G-Police
Gran Turismo
Gran Turismo 2
Grand Theft Auto
Heart of Darkness
In Cold Blood
International Track & Field
International Superstar Soccer Pro
ISS Pro Evolution
The Italian Job
Lilo & Stitch: Trouble in Paradise
Loaded
The Lost World: Jurassic Park
Legacy of Kain: Soul Reaver
Lucky Luke (France only)
Medal of Honor
Medal of Honor: Underground

 2
Metal Gear Solid
Mickey's Wild Adventure
Micro Machines V3
Monsters, Inc. Scare Island
Monopoly
Mortal Kombat Trilogy
Moto Racer
Moto Racer 2
Moto Racer World Tour
Need for Speed: Road Challenge
Need for Speed: Porsche 2000
Oddworld: Abe's Oddysee
Oddworld: Abe's Exoddus
Pandemonium
Parasite Eve 2
Peter Pan: Adventures in Never Land
PGA Tour 96
Porsche Challenge
Rayman
Rayman 2: The Great Escape
Resident Evil
Resident Evil 2

Ridge Racer
Ridge Racer Revolution
Ridge Racer Type 4
Road Rash
Rugrats in Paris: The Movie
Silent Hill
Soul Blade
Soviet Strike
Spider-Man
Spider-Man 2: Enter Electro
Spyro the Dragon
Spyro 2: Gateway to Glimmer
Spyro: Year of the Dragon
Star Wars: Rebel Assault II: The Hidden Empire
Street Fighter EX Plus Alpha
Stuart Little 2
Syphon Filter 2
Syphon Filter 3
Tekken
Tekken 2
Tekken 3
Tenchu: Stealth Assassins
Tenchu 2: Birth of the Stealth Assassins
Thunderhawk 2: Firestorm
Tigger's Honey Hunt
Time Crisis
Time Crisis: Project Titan
TOCA Touring Car Championship
TOCA 2 Touring Cars
TOCA World Touring Cars
Tom Clancy's Rainbow Six: Rogue Spear
Tomb Raider
Tomb Raider II
Tomb Raider III
Tomb Raider Chronicles
Tony Hawk's Skateboarding
Tony Hawk's Pro Skater 2
Tony Hawk's Pro Skater 3
Tony Hawk's Pro Skater 4
Total Drivin'
Toy Story 2: Buzz Lightyear to the Rescue
True Pinball
V-Rally
V-Rally 2
Wipeout
Wipeout 2097
Wipeout 3
Worms
WRC: FIA World Rally Championship Arcade
WWF SmackDown!
WWF SmackDown! 2: Know Your Role
WWF War Zone

PlayStation 2 titles

007: Quantum of Solace
24: The Game
50 Cent: Bulletproof
Athens 2004
Battlefield 2: Modern Combat
Black
Bratz: Forever Diamondz
Bratz: Rock Angelz
Brothers in Arms: Road to Hill 30
Burnout
Burnout 2: Point of Impact
Burnout 3: Takedown
Burnout Dominator
Burnout Revenge
Call of Duty: Finest Hour
Call of Duty 2: Big Red One
Call of Duty 3
Call of Duty: World at War – Final Fronts
Canis Canem Edit
Cars
Colin McRae Rally 2005
Colin McRae Rally 3
Colin McRae Rally 04
Conflict: Desert Storm
Conflict: Desert Storm II
Conflict: Global Terror
Conflict: Vietnam
Crash Bandicoot: The Wrath of Cortex
Crash Nitro Kart
Crash Twinsanity
Crash Tag Team Racing
Crash of the Titans
Crazy Taxi
Dead or Alive 2
Devil May Cry
Devil May Cry 2
Dragon Ball Z: Budokai
Dragon Ball Z: Budokai 2
Dragon Ball Z: Budokai 3
Dragon Ball Z: Budokai Tenkaichi
Dragon Ball Z: Budokai Tenkaichi 2
Dragon Ball Z: Budokai Tenkaichi 3
Dragon Quest: The Journey of the Cursed King
DRIV3R
Enter the Matrix
EyeToy: Play
EyeToy: Play 2
EyeToy: Play 3
EyeToy: Groove
EyeToy: Sports
FIFA 2001
FIFA Football 2002
FIFA Football 2003
FIFA Football 2004
FIFA Football 2005
FIFA 06
FIFA 07
FIFA 08
FIFA 09
FIFA 10
FIFA 11
FIFA 12
FIFA 13
FIFA 14
FIFA Street
FIFA Street 2
Final Fantasy X
Final Fantasy X-2
Final Fantasy XII
Finding Nemo
Formula One 2001
Formula One 2002
Formula One 2003
Formula One 04
Formula One 05
Formula One 06
The Getaway
The Getaway: Black Monday
God of War
God of War II
Gran Turismo 3 A-Spec
Gran Turismo 4
Gran Turismo Concept 2002 Tokyo-Geneva
Grand Theft Auto III
Grand Theft Auto: Vice City
Grand Theft Auto: San Andreas
Grand Theft Auto: Liberty City Stories

Grand Theft Auto: Vice City Stories
Happy Feet
Harry Potter and the Chamber of Secrets
Harry Potter and the Goblet of Fire
Harry Potter and the Order of the Phoenix
Harry Potter and the Prisoner of Azkaban
Harry Potter: Quidditch World Cup
Hitman 2: Silent Assassin
Hulk
Ice Age 2: The Meltdown
Ice Age: Dawn of the Dinosaurs
Jak and Daxter: The Precursor Legacy
Jak II: Renegade
Jak 3
Jak X
James Bond 007: Agent Under Fire
James Bond 007: Everything or Nothing
James Bond 007: Nightfire
Juiced
Killzone
Kingdom Hearts
Kingdom Hearts II
Lego Indiana Jones: The Original Adventures
Lego Star Wars: The Video Game
Lego Star Wars II: The Original Trilogy
The Lord of the Rings: The Fellowship of the Ring
The Lord of the Rings: The Return of the King
The Lord of the Rings: The Third Age
The Lord of the Rings: The Two Towers
Madagascar
Manhunt
Max Payne
Max Payne 2: The Fall of Max Payne
Medal of Honor: European Assault
Medal of Honor: Frontline
Medal of Honor: Rising Sun
Medal of Honor: Vanguard
Metal Gear Solid 2: Sons of Liberty
Metal Gear Solid 3: Snake Eater
Midnight Club: Street Racing
Midnight Club II
Mortal Kombat: Deadly Alliance
Mortal Kombat: Deception
Mortal Kombat: Shaolin Monks
Moto GP
Moto GP 2
Moto GP 3
Moto GP 4
MTV Music Generator 2
MTV Music Generator 3
MX vs. ATV Unleashed
Need for Speed: Carbon
Need for Speed: Most Wanted
Need for Speed: ProStreet
Need for Speed: Underground
Need for Speed: Underground 2
Oni
Onimusha: Warlords
Pirates of the Caribbean: The Legend of Jack Sparrow
Prince of Persia: The Sands of Time
Prince of Persia: The Two Thrones
Prince of Persia: Warrior Within
Pro Evolution Soccer
Pro Evolution Soccer 2
Pro Evolution Soccer 3
Pro Evolution Soccer 4
Pro Evolution Soccer 5
Pro Evolution Soccer 6
Pro Evolution Soccer 2008
Pro Evolution Soccer 2009
Pro Evolution Soccer 2010
Pro Evolution Soccer 2011
Ratchet & Clank
Ratchet & Clank 2: Locked and Loaded
Ratchet & Clank 3: Up Your Arsenal
Ratchet: Gladiator
Rayman 2: Revolution
Rayman 3: Hoodlum Havoc
Rayman Raving Rabbids
RC Revenge Pro
Red Faction
Red Faction 2
Resident Evil 4
Resident Evil – Code: Veronica X
Resident Evil Outbreak
Ricky Ponting Cricket
Rugby 2004
Rugby 2005
Rugby 06
Rugby 08
Shadow of the Colossus
Shadow the Hedgehog
Showdown: Legends of Wrestling
Shrek 2
Shrek the Third

Silent Hill 2: Director's Cut
The Sims
The Sims 2
The Sims Bustin' Out
The Sims 2: Castaway
The Sims 2: Pets
Smash Court Tennis Pro Tournament
Smash Court Tennis Pro Tournament 2
Smuggler's Run
SOCOM U.S. Navy SEALs
SOCOM II U.S. Navy SEALs
SOCOM 3 U.S. Navy SEALs
SOCOM U.S. Navy SEALs: Combined Assault
Sonic Heroes
Sonic Mega Collection Plus
Sonic Riders
Soulcalibur II
Soulcalibur III
Spider-Man
Spider-Man 2
Spider-Man 3
Spyro: Enter the Dragonfly
Spyro: A Hero's Tail
The Legend of Spyro: A New Beginning
The Simpsons Game
The Simpsons: Hit & Run
SSX
SSX 3
SSX on Tour
SSX Tricky
Star Wars: Battlefront
Star Wars: Battlefront II
Star Wars: Bounty Hunter
Star Wars Episode III: Revenge of the Sith
Star Wars: The Force Unleashed
Star Wars: Starfighter
State of Emergency
State of Emergency 2
Stuntman
Stuntman: Ignition
Tekken 4
Tekken 5
Tekken Tag Tournament
This Is Football 2002
This Is Football 2003
This Is Football 2004
This Is Football 2005
Tiger Woods PGA Tour 2002
Tiger Woods PGA Tour 2003
Tiger Woods PGA Tour 2004
Tiger Woods PGA Tour 2005
Tiger Woods PGA Tour 06
TimeSplitters
TimeSplitters 2
TOCA Race Driver
TOCA Race Driver 2
TOCA Race Driver 3
Tom Clancy's Splinter Cell
Tom Clancy's Splinter Cell: Chaos Theory
Tom Clancy's Splinter Cell: Double Agent
Tom Clancy's Splinter Cell: Pandora Tomorrow
Tomb Raider: The Angel of Darkness
Tomb Raider: Anniversary
Tomb Raider: Legend
Tony Hawk's American Wasteland
Tony Hawk's Pro Skater 3
Tony Hawk's Pro Skater 4
Tony Hawk's Underground
Tony Hawk's Underground 2
Tourist Trophy
True Crime: New York City
True Crime: Streets of LA
Ultimate Spider-Man
V-Rally 3
Vexx
Virtua Tennis 2
The Warriors
World Rally Championship
WRC II Extreme
WRC 3
WRC 4
WRC: Rally Evolved
WWE SmackDown! Here Comes the Pain
WWE SmackDown! Shut Your Mouth
WWE SmackDown! vs. RAW
WWE SmackDown! vs. RAW 2006
WWE SmackDown! vs. RAW 2007
WWE SmackDown! vs. RAW 2008
WWE Smackdown! vs. RAW 2009
WWF SmackDown! Just Bring It
X-Men: Next Dimension
X-Men 2: Wolverine's Revenge
X-Men: The Official Game
X-Men Legends
X-Men Legends II: Rise of Apocalypse

PlayStation 3 titles

Army of Two
Army of Two: The 40th Day
Assassin's Creed
Assassin's Creed II – Game of the Year Edition
Assassin's Creed: Brotherhood
Assassin's Creed: Revelations
Avatar: The Game
Batman: Arkham Asylum
Battlefield: Bad Company
Battlefield: Bad Company 2
BioShock
BioShock 2
Borderlands – Game of the Year Edition
Burnout Paradise: The Ultimate Box
Call of Duty 3
Call of Duty 4: Modern Warfare
Call of Duty: Modern Warfare 2
Call of Duty: Black Ops
Call of Duty: World at War
Colin McRae: Dirt
Colin McRae: Dirt 2
Dante's Inferno
Dead Space 2
DiRT 3: Complete Edition
Dragon Age: Origins
Driver: San Francisco
EyePet Move Edition
Fallout 3
Far Cry 2
FIFA 08
FIFA 09
FIFA 10
FIFA 11
FIFA Street 3

Fight Night Round 4
Final Fantasy XIII
God of War III
Gran Turismo 5 Prologue
Gran Turismo 5
Grand Theft Auto IV: The Complete Edition
HAZE
Heavenly Sword
Heavy Rain: Move Edition
Homefront – Ultimate Edition
Infamous
Infamous 2
Just Cause 2
Killzone 2
Killzone 3
LittleBigPlanet – Game of the Year Edition
LittleBigPlanet 2
Mafia II
Medal of Honor
Metal Gear Solid 4: Guns of the Patriots
Midnight Club: Los Angeles – Complete Edition
ModNation Racers
MotorStorm
MotorStorm: Apocalypse
MotorStorm: Pacific Rift
Naruto Shippuden: Ultimate Ninja Storm 2
Need for Speed: Hot Pursuit
Need for Speed: ProStreet
Need for Speed: Shift
Portal 2
Prince of Persia
Pro Evolution Soccer 2009
Pro Evolution Soccer 2010
Pro Evolution Soccer 2011

Pro Evolution Soccer 2012
Prototype
Race Driver: Grid – Reloaded
Ratchet & Clank: Tools of Destruction
Ratchet & Clank: A Crack in Time
Ratchet & Clank: All 4 One
Red Dead Redemption
Resident Evil 5
Resistance: Fall of Man
Resistance 2
Resistance 3
Ridge Racer 7
Saints Row 2
Sniper: Ghost Warrior
Sonic Unleashed
Soulcalibur IV
Star Wars: The Force Unleashed
Street Fighter IV
Tekken 6
The Elder Scrolls IV: Oblivion – GOTY Edition
The Sims 3
Tom Clancy’s Rainbow Six: Vegas
Tom Clancy's Rainbow Six: Vegas 2
Tomb Raider: Underworld
UFC Undisputed 2009
UFC Undisputed 2010
Uncharted: Drake's Fortune
Uncharted 2: Among Thieves
Virtua Tennis 3
WWE SmackDown! vs. Raw 2008
WWE SmackDown! vs. Raw 2009
WWE SmackDown! vs. Raw 2010
WWE SmackDown vs. Raw 2011
WWE '12 Wrestlemania Edition

PlayStation Portable Titles

Ace Combat X: Skies of Deception
Ape Academy
Armored Core: Formula Front
Ben 10: Protector of Earth
Brothers in Arms: D-Day
Burnout Legends
Call of Duty: Roads to Victory
Cars
Chessmaster
Chili Con Carnage
Colin McRae Rally 2005
Crash Tag Team Racing
Crisis Core: Final Fantasy VII
Daxter
Dissidia: Final Fantasy
Dragon Ball Z: Shin Budokai
Dragon Ball Z: Shin Budokai 2
Driver 76
Everybody's Golf
FIFA 06
FIFA 07
FIFA 08
FIFA 09
FIFA 10
FIFA 11
FIFA 12
FIFA 13
FIFA 14
FIFA Street 2
Fired Up
Formula One 06
Formula One Grand Prix
Gangs of London
Go! Sudoku
God of War: Chains of Olympus
God of War: Ghost of Sparta
Gottlieb Pinball Classics
Grand Theft Auto: Liberty City Stories
Grand Theft Auto: Vice City Stories
Gran Turismo
Harry Potter and the Order of the Phoenix
Harry Potter and the Half-Blood Prince
Jak and Daxter: The Lost Frontier
James Cameron's Avatar: The Game

Killzone: Liberation
Harry Potter and the Goblet of Fire
Lego Batman: The Videogame
Lego Indiana Jones: The Original Adventures
Lego Star Wars II: The Original Trilogy
Lemmings
LittleBigPlanet
LocoRoco
LocoRoco 2
Lumines
Medal of Honor: Heroes
Medal of Honor: Heroes 2
: Resurrection
Metal Gear Solid: Peace Walker
Metal Gear Solid: Portable Ops
Midnight Club 3: DUB Edition
Midnight Club: L.A. Remix
ModNation Racers
MotoGP
MotorStorm: Arctic Edge
MX vs. ATV Reflex
Namco Museum Battle Collection
Naruto: Ultimate Ninja Heroes
Need for Speed Carbon: Own The City
Need for Speed: Most Wanted 5-1-0
Need for Speed: ProStreet
Need for Speed: Shift
Need for Speed: Undercover
Need for Speed: Underground Rivals
Peter Jackson's King Kong: The Official Game of the Movie
Prince of Persia: Revelations
Prince of Persia: Rival Swords
Pro Evolution Soccer 2009
Pro Evolution Soccer 2010
Pro Evolution Soccer 2011
Pro Evolution Soccer 5
Pro Evolution Soccer 6
Pursuit Force
Pursuit Force: Extreme Justice
Ratchet & Clank: Size Matters

Resistance: Retribution
Ridge Racer
Ridge Racer 2
Rocky Balboa
Secret Agent Clank
Sega Mega Drive Collection
Smash Court Tennis 3
SOCOM U.S. Navy SEALs: Fireteam Bravo 2
Sonic Rivals
SoulCalibur: Broken Destiny
Star Wars: Battlefront II
Star Wars: Lethal Alliance
Star Wars: The Force Unleashed
Syphon Filter: Dark Mirror
Tekken: Dark Resurrection
Tekken 6
The Simpsons Game
The Sims 2
The Sims 2: Castaway
The Sims 2: Pets
TOCA Race Driver 2
Tomb Raider: Anniversary
Tomb Raider: Legend
Tom Clancy's Rainbow Six: Vegas
Tom Clancy's Splinter Cell: Essentials
Transformers: The Game
Virtua Tennis: World Tour
Wipeout Pulse
Wipeout Pure
World Tour Soccer: Challenge Edition
Worms: Open Warfare
WRC: FIA World Rally Championship
WWE SmackDown vs. Raw 2006
WWE SmackDown vs. Raw 2007
WWE SmackDown vs. Raw 2008
WWE SmackDown vs. Raw 2009
WWE SmackDown vs. Raw 2010

Essentials range

PlayStation 3 titles

Ace Combat: Assault Horizon
Assassin's Creed
Assassin's Creed II – Game of the Year Edition
Assassin's Creed III
Assassin's Creed IV: Black Flag
Assassin's Creed: Brotherhood
Assassin's Creed: Revelations
Avatar: The Game
Batman: Arkham Asylum – GOTY Edition
Batman: Arkham City – GOTY Edition
Battlefield 3
Battlefield 4
Battlefield: Bad Company 2 – Ultimate Edition
Battlefield Hardline
Bayonetta
Borderlands 2
Brothers in Arms: Hell's Highway
Burnout Paradise: The Ultimate Box
Call of Duty 4: Modern Warfare
Call of Duty: Modern Warfare 3
Call of Juarez: Bound in Blood
Call of Juarez: The Cartel
Cars 2
Conflict: Denied Ops
Crysis 2
Crysis 3
DanceStar Party
Dante's Inferno
Darksiders
Dark Souls
Dark Souls: Prepare to Die Edition
Dead or Alive 5
Dead Island Game Of The Year Edition
Dead Island Riptide Complete Edition
Dead Rising 2
Dead Rising 2: Off the Record
Demon's Souls
Dead Space 3
Deus Ex: Human Revolution
Devil May Cry 4
DiRT 3: Complete Edition
 Dishonored: Game of the Year Edition
DmC: Devil May Cry
Dragon Age: Origins
Dragon Age II
Dragon Ball: Raging Blast 2
Dragon Ball Z: Ultimate Tenkaichi
Dragon Ball Xenoverse
Dragon's Dogma: Dark Arisen
Driver: San Francisco
Duke Nukem Forever
Enslaved: Odyssey to the West
Eyepet & Friends
F1 2012
F1 2014
Fallout 3: Game of the Year Edition
Fallout: New Vegas Ultimate Edition
Far Cry 2
Far Cry 3
Far Cry 4
FIFA 12
FIFA 13
FIFA 14
FIFA 15
FIFA 16
FIFA 17
FIFA Street

Final Fantasy XIII
God of War Collection
God of War Collection – Volume II
God of War III
Grand Theft Auto IV: The Complete Edition
Gran Turismo 5
Heavy Rain: Move Edition
Heavenly Sword
Hitman: Absolution
Homefront – Ultimate Edition
Infamous
Infamous 2
Just Cause 2
Kane & Lynch 2: Dog Days
Killzone 2
Killzone 3
Kingdom Hearts HD 1.5 ReMIX
Kingdom Hearts HD 2.5 ReMIX
L.A. Noire: The Complete Edition
LEGO Batman: The Video Game
LEGO Batman 2: DC Super Heroes
LEGO Batman 3: Beyond Gotham
LEGO Harry Potter: Years 1-4
LEGO Harry Potter: Years 5-7
LEGO Indiana Jones: The Original Adventures
LEGO Indiana Jones 2: The Adventure Continues
LEGO Marvel Super Heroes
LEGO Pirates of the Caribbean: The Video Game
LEGO Star Wars: The Complete Saga
LEGO Star Wars III: The Clone Wars
[[Lego The Lord of the Rings (video game)|LEGO The Lord of the Rings]]
LittleBigPlanet – Game of the Year Edition
LittleBigPlanet 2
LittleBigPlanet Karting
Lost Planet 2
Mafia II
MAG
Mass Effect 3
Max Payne 3
Medal of Honor: Warfighter
Medieval Moves
Midnight Club: Los Angeles – Complete Edition
ModNation Racers
Mortal Kombat vs. DC Universe
Mortal Kombat Komplete Edition
MotorStorm
MotorStorm: Apocalypse
MotorStorm: Pacific Rift
Move Fitness
Naruto: Ultimate Ninja Storm
Naruto Shippuden: Ultimate Ninja Storm 2
Naruto Shippuden: Ultimate Ninja Storm 3 Full Burst
Naruto Shippuden: Ultimate Ninja Storm Generations
Need for Speed: Hot Pursuit
Need for Speed: Most Wanted – A Criterion Game
Need for Speed: Rivals – Complete Edition
Need for Speed: The Run
Ninja Gaiden Sigma 2
Ninja Gaiden 3
Ni No Kuni: Wrath of the White Witch
One Piece: Pirate Warriors
Payday 2
PlayStation All-Stars Battle Royale
Portal 2
Prince of Persia
Prince of Persia: The Forgotten Sands

Pro Evolution Soccer 2013
Pro Evolution Soccer 2014
Pro Evolution Soccer 2015
Prototype
Race Driver: Grid – Reloaded
Red Dead Redemption: Game of the Year Edition
Grid 2
Rayman Origins
Rayman Legends
Resident Evil 5: Gold Edition
Resident Evil 6
Resident Evil Operation Raccoon City
Resistance: Fall of Man
Resistance 2
Resistance 3
Saints Row 2
Saints Row: The Third – The Full Package
SEGA Mega Drive Ultimate Collection
Skate 3
Sleeping Dogs
Sniper Elite V2
Sonic & Sega All-Stars Racing
Sonic & All-Stars Racing Transformed
Sonic Generations
Sonic Unleashed
Soulcalibur IV
Soulcalibur V
South Park: The Stick of Truth
Sniper: Ghost Warrior
Sniper: Ghost Warrior 2
Sports Champions
Sports Champions 2
Start the Party!
SSX
Starhawk (2012 video game)
Star Wars: The Force Unleashed – Ultimate Sith Edition
Star Wars: The Force Unleashed II
Super Street Fighter IV Arcade Edition
Tekken 6
Tekken Tag Tournament 2
The Amazing Spider-Man
The Elder Scrolls IV: Oblivion – GOTY Edition
The Elder Scrolls V: Skyrim – Legendary Edition
The LEGO Movie Videogame
The Fight
Thief
Tomb Raider: Underworld
Tomb Raider
Tom Clancy's Ghost Recon Advanced Warfighter 2
Tom Clancy's Ghost Recon: Future Soldier
Tom Clancy's HAWX
Tom Clancy’s Rainbow Six: Vegas
Tom Clancy's Rainbow Six: Vegas 2
Tom Clancy's Splinter Cell: Double Agent
Tom Clancy's Splinter Cell Blacklist
Toy Story 3: The Video Game
Uncharted: Drake's Fortune
Uncharted 2: Among Thieves
Uncharted 3: Drake's Deception
Vanquish
Viking: Battle for Asgard
Virtua Fighter 5
Virtua Tennis 4
WWE 12 Wrestlemania Edition
WWE 13

PlayStation Portable titles

Ace Combat X: Skies of Deception
Ace Combat: Joint Assault
Ape Academy
Ape Escape P
Army of Two: The 40th Day
Assassin's Creed: Bloodlines
ATV Offroad Fury Pro
Avatar: The Legend of Aang
Bakugan Battle Brawlers: Defenders of the Core
Ben 10: Protector of Earth
Ben 10: Alien Force
Ben 10 Alien Force: Vilgax Attacks
Ben 10 Ultimate Alien: Cosmic Destruction
BlazBlue: Calamity Trigger
Breath of Fire III
Brothers in Arms: D-Day
Burnout Legends
Burnout Dominator
Buzz!: Brain Bender
Buzz! Brain of the UK
Buzz!: Master Quiz
Buzz! Quiz World
Buzz!: The Ultimate Music Quiz
Capcom Puzzle World
Capcom Classics Collection Reloaded
Capcom Classics Collection Remixed
Cars
Cars 2
Cloudy with a Chance of Meatballs
Crash of the Titans
Crash: Mind Over Mutant
Crash Tag Team Racing
Dante's Inferno
Darkstalkers Chronicle: The Chaos Tower
Daxter
Despicable Me
Dissidia: Final Fantasy
Dissidia 012: Final Fantasy
Disney Hannah Montana: Rock Out the Show
Dragon Ball Z: Shin Budokai
Dragon Ball Z: Shin Budokai 2
Dragon Ball Z: Tenkaichi Tag Team
Driver '76
echochrome
echoshift
Everybody's Golf
Everybody's Golf 2
Everybody's Tennis
Exit
EyePet
F1 2009
Fat Princess
FIFA 09
FIFA 10
FIFA 11
FIFA 12
FIFA 13
FIFA 14
FIFA Street 2
Fight Night Round 3
Final Fantasy
Final Fantasy II
Final Fantasy IV: The Complete Collection
Final Fantasy Tactics: The War of the Lions
Gangs of London
Gradius Collection
G-Force
Generation of Chaos
Geronimo Stilton in the Kingdom of Fantasy
Geronimo Stilton: Return to the Kingdom of Fantasy
Gladiator Begins
God of War: Chains of Olympus
God of War: Ghost of Sparta

Gods Eater Burst
Gottlieb Pinball Classics
Gran Turismo
Guilty Gear XX Accent Core Plus
Harry Potter and the Goblet of Fire
Harry Potter and the Order of the Phoenix
Harry Potter and the Half-Blood Prince
Invizimals
Invizimals: The Lost Tribes
Invizimals: Shadow Zone
Iron Man
Iron Man 2
Jak & Daxter: The Lost Frontier
Juiced 2: Hot Import Nights
Key of Heaven
Killzone: Liberation
LEGO Batman: The Video Game
LEGO Harry Potter: Years 1–4
LEGO Harry Potter: Years 5–7
LEGO Indiana Jones 2: The Adventure Continues
LEGO Pirates of the Caribbean: The Video Game
LEGO Star Wars III: The Clone Wars
Lemmings
LittleBigPlanet
LocoRoco
LocoRoco 2
Lord of Arcana
Marvel Super Hero Squad
Medal of Honor: Heroes
Medal of Honor: Heroes 2
: Resurrection
Mega Minis Volume 1
Mega Minis Volume 2
Mega Minis Volume 3
Mega Man Maverick Hunter X
Metal Gear Acid
Metal Gear Solid: Portable Ops
ModNation Racers
Monster Hunter Freedom
Monster Hunter Freedom 2
Monster Hunter Freedom Unite
Mortal Kombat: Unchained
MotorStorm: Arctic Edge
MX vs. ATV: Reflex
Namco Museum Battle Collection
Naruto: Ultimate Ninja Heroes 2: The Phantom Fortress
Naruto Shippuden: Ultimate Ninja Heroes 3
Naruto Shippuden: Kizuna Drive
Naruto Shippuden Legends Akatsuki Rising
Naruto Shippuden: Ultimate Ninja Impact
NBA Live 09
NHL 07
Need for Speed Carbon: Own The City
Need for Speed: Most Wanted 5-1-0
Need for Speed: ProStreet
Need for Speed: Underground Rivals
Need for Speed: Shift
Need for Speed: Undercover
Open Season
PaRappa The Rapper
Patapon
Patapon 2
Patapon 3
Peter Jackson's King Kong: The Official Game of the Movie
Petz My Baby Hamster
Petz My Puppy Family
Phantasy Star Portable
Pocket Racers
Pirates of the Caribbean: Dead Man's Chest
Pirates of the Caribbean: At World's End
Power Stone Collection
Prince of Persia Revelations

Prince of Persia Rival Swords
Prince of Persia: The Forgotten Sands
Pursuit Force
Pursuit Force Extreme Justice
Ratchet & Clank: Size Matters
Ratatouille
Resistance: Retribution
Secret Agent Clank
Sega Mega Drive Collection
Sega Rally
Shaun White Snowboarding
Sid Meier's Pirates!
Silent Hill: Origins
Silent Hill: Shattered Memories
Skate Park City
SOCOM U.S. Navy SEALs: Fireteam Bravo 3
Sonic Rivals
Sonic Rivals 2
SoulCalibur: Broken Destiny
Spider-Man 3
Spider-Man: Web of Shadows
Split/Second Velocity
Space Invaders Extreme
SpongeBob SquarePants: The Yellow Avenger
SpongeBob's Truth or Square
Street Fighter Alpha 3 MAX
SSX on Tour
Star Wars: Battlefront II
Star Wars Battlefront: Renegade Squadron
Star Wars Battlefront: Elite Squadron
Star Wars The Clone Wars: Republic Heroes
Star Wars: The Force Unleashed
Super Monkey Ball Adventure
Surf's Up
Syphon Filter: Dark Mirror
Syphon Filter: Logan's Shadow
Tactics Ogre: Let Us Cling Together
Tekken: Dark Resurrection
Tekken 6
Tenchu: Shadow Assassins
Test Drive Unlimited
The Mystery Team
The Sims 2
The Sims 2: Castaway
The Sims 2: Pets
Tiger Woods PGA Tour 10
TMNT
Tron: Evolution
Tomb Raider: Anniversary
Tomb Raider: Legend
Tom Clancy's EndWar
Tom Clancy's Ghost Recon Advanced Warfighter 2
Tom Clancy's Rainbow Six: Vegas
Tom Clancy's Splinter Cell: Essentials
Tony Hawk's Project 8
Tony Hawk's Underground 2: Remix
Transformers: Revenge of the Fallen
The 3rd Birthday
Tomb Raider: Legend
Toy Story 3: The Video Game
UFC Undisputed 2010
Up
Valkyria Chronicles II
WALL-E
Warhammer 40,000: Squad Command
Wipeout Pulse
Wipeout Pure
Worms: Open Warfare
Worms: Open Warfare 2
WWE All Stars
WWE SmackDown vs. Raw 2011
X-Men Origins: Wolverine

PlayStation Hits range

PlayStation 4 

Assassin's Creed IV Black Flag
Batman: Arkham Knight
Bloodborne
Dishonored 2
Doom
Dragon Ball Xenoverse
Dragon Ball Xenoverse 2
Driveclub
Dynasty Warriors 8: Xtreme Legends Complete Edition
Dynasty Warriors 9
EA Sports UFC 2
Earth Defense Force 4.1: The Shadow of New Despair
Fallout 4
Fist of the North Star: Lost Paradise
Friday the 13th: The Game
God of War III Remastered
God of War (2018)
Gran Turismo Sport
Horizon Zero Dawn
Horizon Zero Dawn Complete Edition
inFAMOUS: Second Son
Injustice 2
Killzone: Shadow Fall
The Last of Us Remastered
LittleBigPlanet 3
Metal Gear Solid V: The Definitive Experience
Middle-earth: Shadow of Mordor
Monster Hunter: World
Mortal Kombat X
Naruto Shippuden: Ultimate Ninja Storm 4
Need For Speed
Need For Speed Rivals
Nioh
One Piece Pirate Warriors 3
Plants vs. Zombies: Garden Warfare 2
Project CARS
Ratchet & Clank
Rayman Legends
Resident Evil 6
Resident Evil VII: Biohazard
Street Fighter V
Tales of Berseria
Uncharted: The Nathan Drake Collection
Uncharted 4: A Thief's End
Uncharted: The Lost Legacy
Until Dawn
Watch Dogs
Wolfenstein: The New Order
Yakuza 0
Yakuza Kiwami 2
  Yakuza 6: The Song of Life

References

Budget ranges
PlayStation (brand)
PlayStation (brand)-related lists